Pa Gach-e Kal Jamshid (also Romanized as Pā Gach-e Kal Jamshīd; also known as ‘Asgarī, Pā Gach, and Pā Gachī) is a village in Bahmai-ye Garmsiri-ye Jonubi Rural District, in the Central District of Bahmai County, Kohgiluyeh and Boyer-Ahmad Province, Iran. At the 2006 census, its population was 63, in 12 families.

References 

Populated places in Bahmai County